Hippety Hopper is a Warner Bros. Merrie Melodies cartoon directed by Robert McKimson and written by Warren Foster. The short was released on November 19, 1949, and stars Sylvester and Hippety Hopper.

Plot
A poor depressed mouse attempts suicide at the waterfront, believing the world wouldn’t care if there was one less mouse in it. Just as he is about to leap to his demise, he is stopped by a baby kangaroo in a crate. The mouse makes a deal with the kangaroo; he will be released if the kangaroo terrorizes Sylvester, the source of the rodent's misery. The two devise a plan by making it seem as if vitamins have enlarged the mouse and every time Sylvester sees the kangaroo, he believes the vitamins have worked and the mouse has become jumbo sized. 

Each time Sylvester attempts to defeat the "mouse," he loses, which earns him the ire of the house's bulldog who scolds him for not doing his job as a mouse catcher right. After Sylvester suffers one defeat too many, the bulldog decides to take matters into his own hands. At first it seems the bulldog will be victorious as his larger size makes it harder for the kangaroo to kick him. However, the mouse (unseen by the dog) bites the bulldog on the foot, distracting him with pain enough for the kangaroo to kick the bulldog out of the house, with the mouse threatening to pin the dog's ears back if he sees him again. Disbelieving this, the bulldog states that if that happens, he'll take up ballet; he goes in and is kicked out again with his ears pinned back by a clothespin. The bulldog then drags a gloating Sylvester along to take up ballet after changing into tutus and dancing away.

Home media
Hippety Hopper has been released on the DVD collections Looney Tunes Golden Collection: Volume 6 and Looney Tunes Super Stars' Sylvester and Hippety Hopper: Marsupial Mayhem.

References

1949 films
1949 animated films
1949 short films
Merrie Melodies short films
Sylvester the Cat films
Animated films about dogs
Animated films about kangaroos and wallabies
Films about mice and rats
Films directed by Robert McKimson
Films scored by Carl Stalling
Films scored by Milt Franklyn
Warner Bros. Cartoons animated short films
1940s Warner Bros. animated short films
Hippety Hopper films